(German for The Philosopher's Stone, or the Enchanted Isle) is a two-act singspiel jointly composed by Johann Baptist Henneberg, Benedikt Schack, Franz Xaver Gerl, Emanuel Schikaneder, and Wolfgang Amadeus Mozart in 1790. The libretto was written by Schikaneder.

Composition
Der Stein der Weisen was composed using a "team approach" in which each composer contributed individual sections of the piece. All five wrote parts of act 2, and all except Mozart wrote parts of act 1. Henneberg composed the work's overture. Schikaneder wrote the libretto for the entire piece. The text is based on a fairy tale from Christoph Martin Wieland's , published in the late 1780s.

All five were later involved in The Magic Flute: Mozart as composer, Schikaneder as librettist, impresario and performer (Papageno), Henneberg as conductor, and Schack and Gerl as performers (respectively Tamino and Sarastro). Der Stein der Weisen may have provided a model for that work, as the two have a similar structure and source.

Reception and study
The work was initially popular, but was largely absent from the standard repertoire for the two centuries after 1814. American musicologist David Buch announced the discovery of a Viennese score with attributions to all five composers. This was taken by some to indicate that Der Stein der Weisen was a previously unknown Mozart work, although in fact only a duet ("Nun, liebes Weibchen", known as the "cat duet") and two sections of the act 2 finale were attributed to him.

The autograph of "Nun, liebes Weibchen" (K. 625/592a) is held by the Bibliothèque Nationale in Paris; the rest of the original score is lost. The work is known from a ca. 1795 copy.

Performances
The singspiel was premiered on 11 September 1790 in the Theater auf der Wieden, conducted by Henneberg. It was first recorded by the Boston Baroque in 1999. Modern performances were mounted at the Hampstead & Highgate Festival, Augsburg Opera and Pepperdine University in 2001, by Bampton Classical Opera in 2002, by Combattimento Consort Amsterdam in 2003, the Astoria Music Festival, Garsington Opera and Salzburg's Haus für Mozart in 2006, Opernhaus Zürich (at the Stadttheater Winterthur) in 2010, and the Tiroler Landestheater in Innsbruck in 2018.

References

External links

, Piotr Micinski (bass), Renate Arends (soprano),  conducting

Singspiele
German-language operas
1790 operas
Operas by multiple composers
Arias by Wolfgang Amadeus Mozart
Operas by Wolfgang Amadeus Mozart
Operas
Adaptations of works by Christoph Martin Wieland